The 6th Annual Webby Awards was held on June 21, 2002, at San Francisco's Legion of Honor auditorium. It was presented by the International Academy of Digital Arts and Sciences and was hosted by Tiffany Shlain, the Webby Awards' founder, and Maya Draisin. Coming on the heels of the dot-com bubble (which led to a reduced 2001 awards ceremony), a 2002 Internet bubble forced cutbacks in the event budget for this ceremony as well.

Nominees and winners

References
Winners and nominees are generally named according to the organization or website winning the award, although the recipient is, technically, the web design firm or internal department that created the winning site and in the case of corporate websites, the designer's client.  Web links are provided for informational purposes, both in the most recently available archive.org version before the awards ceremony and, where available, the current website.  Many older websites no longer exist, are redirected, or have been substantially redesigned.

External links

2002
2002 awards in the United States
2002 in San Francisco
June 2002 events in the United States
2002 in Internet culture